is a Japanese manga series written and illustrated by Kenji Morita (森田拳次). The series stars an elementary school boy named , who has little success with anything he tries, and a robot named , which is good with housekeeping. It was serialized in the Kodansha magazine Weekly Shōnen Magazine from 1964 to 1967. A tokusatsu adaptation by Toei Company aired on Nippon Television from March 7, 1966, to February 27, 1967, for 52 episodes; young actor Pepe Hozumi played the title character. An anime adaptation by Studio Pierrot ran on Fuji Television from November 1991 to September 1992 for The 47 episodes.

References

External links
 Marude Dameo at Studio Pierrot
 Marude Dameo at Studio Pierrot 
 Marude Dameo on the official Cartoon Network South Korea website
 

1964 manga
1966 anime television series debuts
1991 anime television series debuts
Fuji TV original programming
Kodansha manga
Nippon TV original programming
Shōnen manga
Pierrot (company)